Frank West is the name of:

 Frank West (Medal of Honor) (1850–1923), Medal of Honor recipient
 Frank West (baseball) (1873–1932), baseball player
 Frank West (Dead Rising), the main character from the 2006 video game Dead Rising

See also
Francis West (disambiguation)